Now and Then may refer to:

Film and television
 Now and Then (film), a 1995 comedy-drama
 Now and Then (The Price Is Right), former name of active game on The Price Is Right, "Now or Then"
 Now and Then, a 1979 Australian film starring Tony Barry
 The Now and Then Show, a Mendocino-based television program

Literature
 Now and Then, a one-act play by David Campton
 Now and Then (Joseph Heller book), a 1998 memoir by Joseph Heller
 Now and Then (novel), in the Spenser series by Robert B. Parker
 Now and Then: The Poems of Gil Scott-Heron, a book of poems by Gil Scott-Heron
 Now and Then, a novel by Robert Penn Warren
 Now and Then, a novel by Samuel Warren
 Now and Then: a memoir of vocation, a partial autobiography by Frederick Buechner

Music
 Now & Then (The Carpenters album), 1973
 Now and Then (Chris de Burgh album), 2008
 Now and Then (Jake Thomas album)
 Now and Then (Michelle Wright album), 1992
 "Now and Then" (Karen Staley song), the title track
 Now & Then (Janie Fricke album), 1993
 Now and Then (The Rowans album), 2004
 Now & Then (Damien Leith album), 2012
 Now and Then (South African series), an anthology album, followed by a second volume
 Now & Then, an album by Aaron Tippin
 Now & Then, an album by Buckner & Garcia
 Now and Them, an album by Smokey Robinson
 Now & Then, a release by Skinnerbox
 "Now and Then" (John Lennon song), an unreleased composition by John Lennon
 "Now and Then" (The Superjesus song), 1998
 "Now and Then", a song by Blackmore's Night from Under a Violet Moon
 "Now & Then", a 1968 song by Gary Puckett & The Union Gap
 "Now & Then", a 2008 song by Algebra from her album Purpose
 Now & Then Records, a British record label for several musicians, including Gary Hughes
 "Now and Then", a song on Lynsey De Paul's 1994 album Just a Little Time
 "Now and Then," a song on Gordon Lightfoot's 1975 album Cold on the Shoulder

See also
 Now and Then, Here and There, a Japanese anime series
 Every Now and Then (disambiguation)
 Then and Now (disambiguation)
Now and "Them", 1968 studio album by Them